The Nagaland football team is the football team of Nagaland, India. The team mainly competes in the Santosh Trophy and in the NE Dr. T. Ao Trophy, among other Indian state football competitions.

Squad
The following 22 players were called for the 2022–23 Santosh Trophy.

References

Football in Nagaland
Santosh Trophy teams